Industry classification or industry taxonomy is a type of economic taxonomy that classifies companies, organizations and traders into  industrial groupings based on similar production processes, similar products, or similar behavior in financial markets.

National and international statistical agencies use various industry-classification schemes to summarize economic conditions. Securities analysts use such groupings to track common forces acting on groups of companies, to compare companies' performance to that of their peers, and to construct either specialized or diversified portfolios.

Sectors and industries 
Economic activities can be classified in a variety of ways. At the top level, they are often classified according to the three-sector theory into sectors: primary (extraction and agriculture), secondary (manufacturing), and tertiary (services). Some authors add quaternary (knowledge) or even quinary (culture and research) sectors. Over time, the fraction of a society's activities within each sector changes.

Below the economic sectors are more detailed classifications. They commonly divide economic activities into industries according to similar functions and markets and identify businesses producing related products.

Industries can also be identified by product, such as: construction industry, chemical industry, petroleum industry, automotive industry, electronic industry, power engineering and power manufacturing (such as gas or wind turbines), meatpacking industry, hospitality industry, food industry, fish industry, software industry, paper industry, entertainment industry, semiconductor industry, cultural industry, and poverty industry.

Market-based classification systems such as the Global Industry Classification Standard (GICS), the Industry Classification Benchmark (ICB) and The Refinitiv Business Classification (TRBC) are used in finance and market research.

List of classifications 
A wide variety of taxonomies is in use, sponsored by different organizations and based on different criteria.

1The NAICS Index File lists 19745 rubrics beyond the 6 digits which are not assigned codes.

See also
 Economic sector
 Economic industry
 Product classification

References

Further reading
 
 
 Bernard Guibert, Jean Laganier, and Michel Volle, "An Essay on Industrial Classifications", Économie et statistique 20 (February 1971) full text